Bausendorf (also known locally as Bausendorf-Olkenbach) is an Ortsgemeinde – a municipality belonging to a Verbandsgemeinde, a kind of collective municipality – in the Bernkastel-Wittlich district in Rhineland-Palatinate, Germany.

Geography 

The holiday resort of Bausendorf with its outlying centre of Olkenbach is found sheltered at the foot of the broad Kondelwald forest in the southern Eifel in the lower Alf valley. The municipal area is 54.5% wooded. It belongs to the Verbandsgemeinde of Traben-Trarbach.

History 
Beginning in 1794, Bausendorf was under French rule, and then in 1814 the village was assigned to the Kingdom of Prussia at the Congress of Vienna. Since 1947, it has been part of the then newly founded state of Rhineland-Palatinate. Today's Ortsgemeinde came into being within the framework of administrative reform through the merger of the formerly separate municipalities of Bausendorf and Olkenbach on 7 June 1969.

Politics 

The municipal council is made up of 16 council members, who were elected by proportional representation at the municipal election held on 7 June 2009, and the honorary mayor as chairman.

The municipal election held on 7 June 2009 yielded the following results:

Culture and sightseeing
The St. Bartholomäus Wallfahrtskirche Heinzerath (“Saint Bartholomew’s Heinzerath Pilgrimage Church”) in the outlying centre of Olkenbach stands on the bank of the Alf. The inhabitants of the nearby Eifel, the middle Moselle and the “Wittlich Valley” (Wittlicher Tal) make a pilgrimage each year to this church at harvest time.

Economy and infrastructure 
Bausendorf has a daycare centre and a primary school. It also has a bakery, a postal agency, two electrical specialists’ shops, a butcher shop and three car dealerships.

Through the municipality runs Bundesstraße 49. To the west runs the Autobahn A 1. In Ürzig is a railway station on the Moselstrecke (Moselle Line).

References

External links 

Municipality’s official webpage 

Bernkastel-Wittlich